Faïza Tsabet (born March 22, 1985, in Chlef) is an Algerian international volleyball player. She played for the national team. She has been part of Algeria's Olympic volleyball team in 2008.

In April 2012, she took part in the 2012 FIVB Grand Prix play-offs, but shortly afterwards she suddenly retired from professional volleyball.

Club information

Previous club  :  NR Chlef (2010–2012)
Previous club  :  CV Tenerife
Previous club :  Istres volleyball (2006–2009)
Debut club :  GS Chlef (1998–2006)

References

1985 births
Living people
People from Chlef
Algerian women's volleyball players
Volleyball players at the 2008 Summer Olympics
Olympic volleyball players of Algeria
Competitors at the 2009 Mediterranean Games
Algerian expatriate sportspeople in Spain
Algerian expatriate sportspeople in France
Wing spikers
Expatriate volleyball players in France
Expatriate volleyball players in Spain
Mediterranean Games competitors for Algeria
21st-century Algerian people